Zimplow is a manufacturer based in Zimbabwe.  Zimplow makes farm equipment such as plows, harrows, planters, cultivators, hoes, shovels etc.  Zimplow is a specialist in animal traction technology and its main equipment brand is the Mealie Brand. Other divisions include C.T.Bolts and Tassburg.

The company's stock is listed on the Zimbabwe Stock Exchange and on its stock index, the Zimbabwe Industrial Index. The company is headquartered in Bulawayo.

References

External links
Zimplow Limited

Manufacturing companies of Zimbabwe
Agriculture companies of Zimbabwe
Companies listed on the Zimbabwe Stock Exchange
Bulawayo